The Tour du Mont Blanc or TMB is one of the most popular long-distance walks in Europe.

It is considered one of the classic long-distance hiking trails. The circular route is normally walked in a counter-clockwise direction in 9-14 days. It is also the route of an annual mountain marathon in which the winners normally cover the entire distance in less than 26 (women's race) or 20 hours (men's race).

Route
Usual start points are Les Houches in the Chamonix valley or Les Contamines in the Montjoie valley (in France), Courmayeur from the Italian side, and either Champex or a point near Martigny in Switzerland. The route passes through seven valleys around the Mont-Blanc massif, an anti-clockwise start in Chamonix would lead through the Chamonix (or Arve) valley, then Montjoie, Vallée des Glaciers, Italian Val Veni, Val Ferret, Swiss Val Ferret, and either the Arpette or Trient valley in Switzerland, dependent on the route chosen.

The "official" route has changed over the course of the years and many alternatives, or "variantes", exist to the standard route. Some can take an intrepid walker onto paths requiring greater fitness, awareness and skill. Others provide less demanding options, which are often quicker than the accepted route, but provide lesser viewpoints onto the mountain ranges. For a part of the way, between the summit of Brevent and the Col de la Croix du Bonhomme, the route coincides with the European long-distance footpath GR5 as it makes its way from the North Sea to the Mediterranean Sea. A link can also be made with the walkers' Haute Route from Chamonix to Zermatt in the Swiss Alps.

This is not high enough to cause altitude sickness for most people, nevertheless the trail provides a tough physical challenge. Experience of walking in mountain country is vital and, because mountain weather can change very rapidly, participants on the Tour du Mont Blanc should be suitably equipped.

Plentiful accommodation exists along the entire route, allowing it to be broken into segments to suit any fit person. This takes a variety of forms, from separate bedrooms to large mixed-sex dormitories. Cooked meals are available at most. With a start at Les Houches one might expect overnight stops at Les Contamines, Col de la Croix du Bonhomme refuge or Les Chapieux (depending on variant route taken), Elisabetta Soldini refuge, Courmayeur, Elena refuge, Champex, Trient village, Argentiere, La Flegere refuge and finally back to Les Houches. Despite the abundance of choice, the popularity of the trail can lead to problems finding accommodation, even if booking in advance.

Legs

UltraMarathon

The route of the Tour du Mont Blanc is used for an annual ultramarathon event called the Ultra-Trail du Mont-Blanc. The winning time is usually around 20 hours to complete the entire circuit.

References

External links
Tour du Mont Blanc website

Mont Blanc
Hiking trails in France
Mont Blanc
Mont Blanc
Mont Blanc